Greta Crafoord (born 28 December 2000) is a Swedish pair skater. With her twin brother and skating partner, John Crafoord, she is a two-time Swedish junior champion and placed 15th at the 2020 World Junior Championships.

Personal life 
Greta Crafoord was born on 28 December 2000 in Gothenburg, Sweden. She is the daughter of Ann and Thomas and the twin sister of John Crafoord. The family moved to the United States in 2009.

Career 
Crafoord began learning to skate in 2005.

2017–18 season 
During the 2017–18 season, the Crafoord twins trained in Aliso Viejo, California, coached by Jenni Meno and Todd Sand. They made their junior international debut in September, placing 12th at a 2017–18 ISU Junior Grand Prix (JGP) event in Latvia. They were 16th at their second JGP assignment in Poland and won the junior bronze medal at the Bavarian Open.

The pair made no international appearances the following season.

2019–20 season 
The Crafoords placed fourth in the junior pairs event at the Bavarian Open and 15th at the 2020 World Junior Championships in Tallinn, Estonia. They trained in Colorado Springs, Colorado, under Dalilah Sappenfield.

2020–21 season 
Making their senior international debut, the Crafoords placed fourth at the NRW Trophy in November 2020 and eighth at the International Challenge Cup in February.

2021–22 season 
The pair placed tenth at the Cranberry Cup International and ninth at the John Nicks Pairs Challenge. They then competed at the 2021 CS Nebelhorn Trophy, the final qualifying opportunity for the 2022 Winter Olympics. Their placement (14th) was insufficient to qualify. The pair missed the rest of the season due to Greta's broken knee cap.

2022–23 season 
Having recovered from her final surgery, Greta Crafoord returned to the ice in September 2022. The twins decided to train under Aljona Savchenko in Heerenveen, Netherlands.

They made their Grand Prix debut at the 2022 Skate America, where they placed eighth. They were also eighth at the 2022 Grand Prix of Espoo.  After coming twelfth at the 2022 CS Golden Spin of Zagreb, they won the Swedish national title, and finished thirteenth at the 2023 European Championships.

Programs 
with John Crafoord

Competitive highlights 
GP: Grand Prix; CS: Challenger Series; JGP: Junior Grand Prix

with Crafoord for Sweeden

with Crafoord for the United States

References

External links 
 
 
 

2000 births
Living people
Sportspeople from Gothenburg
Swedish female pair skaters